Sajjad Amin Malik (born ) is a Pakistani male weightlifter, competing in the 105 kg category and representing Pakistan at international competitions. He participated at the 2010 Commonwealth Games in the 105 kg event.

Major competitions

References

1973 births
Living people
Pakistani male weightlifters
Weightlifters at the 2010 Commonwealth Games
Commonwealth Games competitors for Pakistan
Place of birth missing (living people)
Weightlifters at the 2006 Asian Games
Asian Games competitors for Pakistan